Aditya Jagtap (born 7 May 1992) is an Indian male squash player. He is currently competing at the 2019-20 PSA World Tour. He achieved his highest career ranking of 64 in June 2021. Aditya is currently ranked 64 according to the world rankings.

Jagtap graduated from Cornell University in 2015 while playing on the Big Red men's squash team.

References 

1992 births
Living people
Indian male squash players
Cornell Big Red men's squash players
People from Ahmednagar
20th-century Indian people
21st-century Indian people